The Uzbekistan national cricket team represents the nation of Uzbekistan in international cricket and administered by Cricket Federation of Uzbekistan. In July 2022, the International Cricket Council (ICC) inducted the team as an Associate Member, becoming the 25th member in the Asia region.

In April 2018, the ICC decided to grant full Twenty20 International (T20I) status to all its members. Therefore, all Twenty20 matches played between Uzbekistan and other ICC members after 1 January 2019 will be a full T20I.

History
Before being officially inaugurated in November 2019 as Cricket Federation of Uzbekistan, cricket has been played in the country since 1997. The first ever registered matches were organized by The British High Commission in Uzbekistan among the embassies of cricket-playing nations. Later, Indian and other residents of cricketing countries began organising regular intra-organisational cricket games. In 1999, a cricket event took place when British Embassy Team played against a crew of players from India, Pakistan, Bangladesh and Malaysia. Presently there are more than 2000 players from various country districts, learning the game's techniques.

2021
In March 2021, the Cricket Federation of Uzbekistan announced the launch of Uzbekistan Premier League that would be played in August, but due to the Covid-19 pandemic the league had to be postponed.

In July 2021, Uzbekistan started the construction of its first official cricket stadium in Tashkent.

Associate membership (2022–present)
On 26 July 2022, Uzbekistan became an Associate member of the ICC along with Cambodia and Ivory Coast.

Head coaches

External links
Cricket Federation of Uzbekistan
Uzbekistan cricket

References

Cricket in Uzbekistan
National cricket teams
Cricket